Rhodanobacter  is a Gram-negative and non-motile genus of Pseudomonadota.

References

Further reading 
 
 
 
 

Xanthomonadales
Bacteria genera